{{Automatic taxobox
| image = Nepheloleuca complicata.jpg
| image_caption = Nepheloleuca complicata
| display_parents = 2
| taxon = Nepheloleuca
| authority = Butler, 1883
}}Nepheloleuca', is a genus of moths in the family Geometridae erected by Arthur Gardiner Butler in 1883. The genus includes twelve species, similar in appearance, yet different in ground color and with minor variations in markings. Nepheloleuca species occur on the Caribbean islands of Haiti, Cuba and Jamaica, but also on mainland South America.

Selected speciesNepheloleuca absentimacula Warren, 1900Nepheloleuca complicata (Guenee, 1858)Nepheloleuca floridata (Grote, 1883)Nepheloleuca peruviana Herbulot, 2002Nepheloleuca politia (Cramer, 1777)Nepheloleuca semiplaga Warren, 1894

References

"Swallow-tailed moth". Learn About Butterflies''.

Ourapterygini
Moth genera